New Lount is a   Local Nature Reserve north-east of Ashby-de-la-Zouch in  Leicestershire. It is owned and managed by Leicestershire County Council.

This site has a diverse bird population, such as green woodpeckers, chiffchaffs, blackcaps, willow warblers and goldcrests. Soprano and common pipistrelles catch insects over the site's four ponds.

There is access from Melbourne Road.

References

Local Nature Reserves in Leicestershire